is an anime series directed by Tatsuo Sato and produced by Madhouse. Shingu aired from May 8, 2001, through December 4, 2001, on NHK. It ran for 26 episodes and was released on DVD on five volumes by The Right Stuf International in the United States.

On March 3, 2008, the series made its North American television debut on the Funimation Channel.

Story
The setting is in a fictional seaside town called Tenmo in the Kanagawa Prefecture. In the year 2070, an alien invasion of Tokyo is repelled by a mysterious giant being which is almost a monster in itself. This battle is witnessed by Subaru Muryou and his grandfather who comment about it and watch it as if this is nothing to be surprised or shocked about, even though everyone else seems panicked. Later, a middle schooler named Murata Hajime witnesses Muryou and a student council member, Kyouichi Moriguchi, fighting each other with some sort of super psychic powers. This causes a series of events which brings Hajime to the stunning discovery that almost everyone in his school seems to know about the giant that defeated the alien invasion over Tokyo. Further to his shock is that it seems everyone in the older part of Tenmo, the town he moved to a few years ago, holds this strange secret and in fact a deeper one, and has been holding it for many years.

The secret is that many of the leading families of the older part of the town have been using their powers and the power of the giant, called "Shingu", to protect Earth for centuries. As Hajime learns this, it comes as something of a shock to him that all of the current members of the middle school student council are actually the guardians of this secret and of Shingu itself for this current generation. This includes Student Vice President Nayuta Moriyama, who, as it turns out, guards one of the biggest parts of the secret of Shingu. While all of these discoveries are a huge enough shock to him, Hajime also discovers that many of the town's other residents are in fact intergalactic diplomats. The more he learns and the closer his friendship with Muryou, Nayuta and the other members of the student council becomes, the deeper he is drawn into this secret. Especially as his friendship with Nayuta and Muryou grows deeper, Hajime slowly begins to realize he has a very large role to play in the future of both Shingu and Earth's protection.

Characters

Voiced by: Issei Miyazaki (Japanese), Daniel Kevin Harrison (English)

This mysterious transfer student came to Misumaru Middle School wearing a 20th-century school uniform, something rarely seen in the year 2070. He's always calm and laid-back, but at the same time, he has secret powers that he rarely reveals. Little is known about Muryou; in fact, the more that's revealed about him, the more enigmatic he becomes. He seems to know something about the recent alien incidents, though, which makes Vice President Kyouichi instantly suspicious.

Voiced by: Kenji Nojima (Japanese), Billy Regan (English)

The narrator of our story. He's a middle-schooler, and the class rep for 2nd year homeroom C. After discovering that Muryou and Kyouichi have astonishing powers, he decides to keep track of all the strange events that start to unfold – but he soon finds himself more deeply involved than he bargained for. Hajime is very social, mature for his age, and adjusts well to even the most bizarre situations. He frequently breaks the fourth wall while narrating his feelings. The concept of speaking beyond the fourth wall can be considered in itself a great power.

Voiced by: Tomokazu Sugita (Janpanese), Dan Green (English)

Misumaru Middle School's passionate Student Vice President. He has a black belt in martial arts and a lightning-quick temper to match, but he's also very loyal and will stand by his friends no matter what. There appears to be some kind of connection between Kyouichi and Harumi; but at the moment, neither of them seems willing – or able – to acknowledge it. Despite all his harsh words, Kyouichi actually does have a soft side, and is hard not to like.

Voiced by: Romi Paku (Japanese), Angora Deb (English)

The other vice president at Misumaru Middle School; she's an honor student who always goes by the rules. Daughter of the Shrine Priest at the local Tenmo Shrine, Nayuta is very serious, almost to a fault. She has trouble expressing her emotions, and she doesn't like the idea of depending on anyone else.

Voiced by: Yuuji Ueda (Japanese), Brian Maillard (English)

Hachiyou is the student government president. His personality is very calm and quiet, but with a certain commanding presence – whenever trouble appears, Hachiyou is quick to take charge. He's a bit like a father figure for the group; with only a word from Hachiyou, even the hot-headed Nayuta and Kyouichi will calm down and follow his lead.

Voiced by: Yumiko Kobayashi (Japanese), Tara Jayne (English)

Shun is the student government secretary. He's always cheerful, no matter what the situation; he's also very sharp, and eloquent with his words. Perhaps that's why he's so incredibly popular amongst the students (especially the ladies!) Shun has many responsibilities around the school; he's often called on to be an announcer at events, and he's a member of the Theatre Club – a natural match for his acting skills.

Voiced by: Masumi Asano (Japanese), Jane Lingo (English)

The treasurer of the student government. She's quiet and demure, but also extremely resilient; she seems to deliberately avoid being in the spotlight, and usually hides her emotions. Harumi's role in the mystery that surrounds the Shingu is unclear, but one thing is certain – despite appearances, Harumi is a skilled fighter, and she takes her duties very seriously.

Voiced by: Wakana Yamazaki (Japanese), Megan Hollingshead (English)

Muryou's older sister. She's a college student who lives in Tokyo, but she often comes to Lady Momoe's home to visit Muryou. In fact, it's become a trademark of hers to stop by with all sorts of sweets from various parts of Japan. She's got a cheerful disposition, and sometimes seems a bit scatterbrained. But like many people in Hajime's life, there's more to her meets the eye... Setsuna has many hidden qualities, but one thing's for certain – she's very good at looking after people.

Voiced By: Noriko Hidaka (Japanese), Lisa Ortiz (English)

Hajime's mother. She has two children, Futaba (an elementary-schooler) and, of course, Hajime (a middle schooler). She's a young mother, and currently takes care of the kids and the house while her husband is away. Casual and easygoing, Kyoko's pretty laid back when it comes to the kids doing their schoolwork, but she's very strict about their manners. Kyoko is a woman of many skills; not only is she good at running the Murata household, but she plays a mean game of Bam Bam Sumo Tournament, too. She is employed by the local library to assist with taking ancient scrolls, old books and microfilms and converting them to a digital format. This involves memorizing the original, and sometimes having to translate the original, before entering it into the database.

Voiced by: Rie Kugimiya (Japanese), Angora Deb (English)

Hajime's younger sister. She's a bubbly sixth grader who tends to fall in love with her brother's friends, a prime example being Muryou. Always optimistic, energetic and curious, Futaba is never afraid to speak her mind. She and her brother fight like cats and dogs...but in truth, she loves her brother a lot.

Voiced by: Hisako Kyōda (Japanese), Rachael Lillis (English)

The Head Mistress of the Sanemori family. She holds an important position among the people of Tenmo, but the nature of her position has yet to be revealed. Momoe seems to know the truth about many things – Tenmo, Nayuta, even Muryou – so it's no surprise that when important events take place, Momoe is there to guide the way with her wisdom.

Voiced by: Kenichi Ono (Japanese), John Campbell (English)

He's a Velunnian who goes by many names: Aloha, Ve-yan, Jil...but the one he uses most is Jiltosh. While most aliens do their best to blend in, Jiltosh's happy-go-lucky persona has bubbled over into his appearance – you'll always be able to spot his wavy curls and bright red Hawaiian shirt. Jiltosh is a first-class diplomat, and every once in a while, you can tell that there's something hidden behind his cheerful smile...

Voiced by: Bon Ishihara (Japanese), Michael Alston Baley (English)

Hajime's homeroom teacher and also teaches Japanese history. He has a very mellow personality and at first glance, he seems like an average, ordinary man. But Mr. Yamamoto has an important role in policing the area and he can pull off some surprising fighting techniques! Mr. Yamamoto is an easy-going, approachable guy, and he's very popular amongst his students.

Voiced by: Yōko Sasaki (Japanese), Carol Jacobanis (English)

Hiromi Isozaki (if that is, in fact, her real name), is the phys-ed instructor and teacher at Misumaru Middle School...or is this just a front? She may seem unemotional at times, but she is very much attached to her students. No matter what happens, she always does her best to be calm and in control.

Voiced by: Shigeru Shibuya (Japanese), Marc Thompson (English)

Weinul is a lieutenant in the Zaiglian Space Force. Weinul is a man in search of the truth; and to that end, he's decided to blend in with the people of Earth. Just like other Zaiglians, he's very pokerfaced... But at the same time, he's also calm and collected, as any good lieutenant should be. Though he's not much of a talker, Weinul is always ready and willing to adapt to new situations.

Kazuo Murata
Voiced by: Tetsuo Sakaguchi (Japanese), Wayne Grayson (English)

Hajime's father. He's kept quite busy with his work for a private company at the Tanegashima Space Center so he doesn't get to spend much time at home. Kazuo is cheerful and easygoing, but he does have a certain mystique. He will occasionally break the "fourth wall", too.

Kanata Myouken
Voiced by: Kōsuke Okano (Japanese), Bill Rogers (English)

This mysterious figure first appears during the big judo match between Mischu and Miyanomori. He's there under the guise of a simple team helper, but there's more to him than meets the eye. Kanata is quiet, but extremely confident – and he has every reason to be.

Episodes

References

External links
TRSI Official Shingu: Secret of the Stellar Wars Website

2001 anime television series debuts
Anime with original screenplays
Madhouse (company)
NHK original programming